Tchaikovsky's Serenade for Strings in C major, Op. 48, was composed in 1880.

Form

Serenade for Strings has 4 movements:

Tchaikovsky intended the first movement to be an imitation of Mozart's style, and it was based on the form of the classical sonatina, with a slow introduction.  The stirring 36-bar Andante introduction is marked "sempre marcatissimo" and littered with double-stopping in the violins and violas, forming towering chordal structures. This introduction is restated at the end of the movement, and then reappears, transformed, in the coda of the fourth movement, tying the entire work together.

On the second page of the score, Tchaikovsky wrote, "The larger number of players in the string orchestra, the more this shall be in accordance with the author's wishes."

The second movement, Valse, has become a popular piece in its own right.

Premieres
The Serenade was given a private performance at the Moscow Conservatory on 3 December 1880. Its first public performance was in St Petersburg on 30 October 1881 under Eduard Napravnik.

References in other contexts
 The score was used as the foundation of the George Balanchine ballet Serenade in 1934.
 The waltz in the second movement was arranged for soprano and full orchestra for the 1945 MGM film Anchors Aweigh under the name "From the Heart of a Lonely Poet" and performed by Kathryn Grayson with José Iturbi conducting the MGM studio orchestra.
 The piece incidentally accompanied the final countdown for the Trinity atomic bomb test July 16, 1945, when it was being broadcast by a Voice of America station on the same frequency being used to transmit test communications.
 The waltz section was also used as the startup theme for British television station Channel Television in the 1980s.
 Excerpts from the score were used in the 2005 ballet Anna Karenina, choreographed by Boris Eifman.
 The waltz was used in the Google Doodle for the 100th anniversary of the completion of the Trans-Siberian Railway in 2016.
 The first movement (Pezzo in forma di sonatina: Andante non troppo — Allegro moderato) is the motif of Stefano Valentini, one of the main antagonists in the game The Evil Within 2.
 Excerpts from the score were used during NBC's broadcast of a 1983 NFL playoff game between the San Diego Chargers and the Pittsburgh Steelers as a lead in to commercial breaks.
 The second movement was used a few times in the 2021 South Korean survival drama TV series Squid Game.
 The waltz in the second movement is featured in "On Wine: How to Select & Serve," which in turn is sampled on the Beastie Boys "The Blue Nun" from "Check Your Head."

See also
 Serenade for Strings (Dvořák)
 Serenade for Strings (Elgar)

References

External links

Tchaikovsky Research
Performance of Serenade for Strings by A Far Cry from the Isabella Stewart Gardner Museum in MP3 format

Compositions by Pyotr Ilyich Tchaikovsky
Serenades
1880 compositions
Compositions in C major
Compositions for string orchestra